Paul Lynch (born June 11, 1946) is a Canadian film director and television director.

Lynch came to Canada in 1960. He left school to become a cartoonist for the Toronto Star and then served as a photographer for a number of small-town newspapers. This led to work in film, including a 90-minute documentary on Penthouse magazine commissioned by its publisher, Bob Guccione. His first feature film was The Hard Part Begins. This was followed by the box-office hit Prom Night, a straightforward slasher film starring Jamie Lee Curtis and Leslie Nielsen. Lynch has only made movies periodically, pursuing instead a career directing for American television.

Filmography

Films
The Hard Part Begins (1973)
Blood & Guts (1978)
Prom Night (1980)
Humongous (1982)
Cross Country (1983)
Blindside (1986)
Flying (a.k.a. Dream to Believe, 1986)
Bullies (1986)
On the Prowl (1991)
No Contest (1995)
No Contest II (a.k.a. Face the Evil, 1997)
More to Love (1999)
Frozen with Fear (2000)
The Keeper (2004)

Television films
Teenage Marriage (1968)
Mania (1986)
Really Weird Tales (1987)
Cameo by Night (1987)
Going to the Chapel (a.k.a. Wedding Day Blues, 1988)
Maigret (1988)
She Knows Too Much (1989)
Murder by Night (a.k.a. Nightmare, 1989)
Double Your Pleasure (a.k.a. The Reluctant Agent, 1989)
Drop Dead Gorgeous (a.k.a. Victim of Beauty, 1991)
Spenser: Ceremony (1993)
Savage Planet (2007)

Television series
Petrocelli (1974)
Darkroom (1981)
Voyagers! (1982)
Murder, She Wrote (1984)
Moonlighting (1985)
The Ray Bradbury Theater (1985)
The Twilight Zone (1985)
Blacke's Magic (1986)
Mike Hammer (1987)
Tour of Duty (1987)
Beauty and the Beast (1987)
Star Trek: The Next Generation (episodes: "The First Duty", "11001001", "The Naked Now", "Unnatural Selection" and "A Matter of Time")
Hooperman (1988)
The Bronx Zoo (1988)
Beverly Hills Buntz (1988)
In the Heat of the Night (1989)
Top Cops (1990)
Dark Shadows (1991)
Matrix (1993)
Star Trek: Deep Space Nine (1993) (episodes: "A Man Alone", "Babel", "Q-Less", "The Passenger" and "Battle Lines")
Kung Fu: The Legend Continues (1993)
Robocop: The Series (1994)
Due South (1994)
Lonesome Dove: The Series (1994)
Liberty Street (1994)
Xena: Warrior Princess (1995)
Land's End (1995)
Baywatch Nights (1995)
The Outer Limits (1995)
Viper (1995)
F/X: The Series (1996)
Poltergeist: The Legacy (1996)
The Magician's House (1999)
Sliders (1998-1999)
So Weird (1999-2001)

References

External links

Paul Lynch at Northern Stars – Canadians in the Movies

1946 births
Living people
Canadian film directors
Canadian television directors
English-language film directors
English emigrants to Canada
Film people from Liverpool